The Mauritius Broadcasting Corporation (MBC) is the national public broadcaster of the Republic of Mauritius, that is the islands of Mauritius, Rodrigues, and Agaléga. The headquarters of the MBC is found at Réduit, Moka, it also operates a station in Rodrigues. The MBC programmes are broadcast in 12 languages, notably French, Creole, English, Hindi, Urdu, Bhojpuri, Tamil, Telugu, Marathi, Mandarin/Cantonese, and Hakka, it provides 17 television channels in Mauritius, 4 in Rodrigues and 2 in Agaléga and 7 radio channels.

Overview 
The MBC operates under the  aegis of the Prime Minister’s Office. It is established as a body corporate under Act No. 7 of 1964. According to the provisions of the Act, its main objectives are to provide independent and impartial broadcasting services of information, education, culture, and entertainment in different languages taught or spoken in the country, and to ensure that the broadcasting services cater for the aspirations, needs, and tastes of the population in the matters of information, education, culture, and entertainment. Opposition parties and media commentators often criticise the MBC for pro-government bias. The MBC is a member of the Association des Radios et Télévisions de l’Océan Indien (ARTOI), Commonwealth Broadcasting Association, and an associate member at the European Broadcasting Union, the Asia-Pacific Broadcasting Union, and the South African Broadcasting Association and of the Conseil International des Radios-Télévisions d’Expression Française.

List of MBC Channels

Television

Radio

History 
It was established as a body corporate on 8 June 1964 under the Mauritius Broadcasting Corporation Ordinance no. 7 (1964). Prior to that date, it operated as a Government Service under the name of Mauritius Broadcasting Service.

The original ordinance establishing the Mauritius Broadcasting Corporation was amended and consolidated by Acts of Parliament: Act no. 65 of 1970, Act no. 22 of 1982, and Act no. 65 of 1985. These amendments were necessary to accommodate interalia changes at both technological and social levels as well as to satisfy the aspirations of all segments of the Mauritian nation.

TV broadcasts started on a pilot basis in 1964 with the installation of three repeater stations at Fort George, Mount Thérése, and Jurançon. On 8 February 1965, television was officially launched with a daily evening transmission of about three hours. The first live local program was broadcast on the occasion of the visit of Princess Alexandra in 1968.

The phasing out process of black and white television started in 1973 and indeed the OCAMM Conference which was held at the Mahatma Gandhi Institute in the same year was broadcast live in colour (SECAM system). By 1978 the MBC was fully equipped for the broadcast of colour programs. The MBC started its operation in Rodrigues on 7 November 1987. A second channel was launched on 30 July 1990, the MBC 2. The MBC 3 became operational in March 1996.

In 2005, the MBC was the first public television broadcaster in Africa to launch Digital Terrestrial Television channels. In 2007, the MBC also extended its digitalized service to the islands of Rodrigues and Agaléga. In 2011, the MBC moved from its former headquarters in Forest Side, Curepipe to Moka. The Bhojpuri Channel and Senn Kreol were launched in January 2013.

In 2012, the President of the Republic stated that the MBC is run with a mindset of unfairness, partiality, and is not worthy of a democratic nation.

On 14 November 2016, MBC rebranded the logo of its 17 channels and introduced a standardised logo with different colour variations for each channel. Additionally, new onscreen graphics were introduced.

MBC broadcasts many of its own shows, promoting the country and the physical and mental health of the people of Mauritius.

On 1 December 2016, the MBC released the MBC play app, which is still under development, on Google Play Store, allowing users around the globe to stream Live TV & radio channels of the corporation. Later on, after releasing a stable version, this app is also expected to be available on the Apple App Store.

MBC Board and Senior Management 
Mr. Premode Neerunjun, Chairman of the MBC Board

Mr Moonendra Nudhi Sharma (Anooj) RAMSURRUN, Director-General of the MBC

Mr Kavish Pultoo, ex-officio member on the MBC Board, Director Information Services at the Government Information Services.

Mr Vijay Chandreeka Ah Ku, Board Member

Mr Avinash Venkama, Board Member

Mr Jason Maulette, Board Member

Mr. M.S. Nahaboo Solim, Board Member

See also

 MBC 1 (Mauritian TV channel)
 MBC 2 (Mauritian TV channel)
 MBC 3 (Mauritian TV channel) 
 BTV (Mauritian TV channel)
 Kids Channel (Mauritian TV channel)
 Media of Mauritius

References

 
Television in Mauritius
1964 establishments in Mauritius
Multilingual broadcasters
Television channels and stations established in 1964